Allentown station could refer to two stations in Allentown, Pennsylvania:
 Allentown station (Central Railroad of New Jersey)
 Allentown station (Lehigh Valley Railroad)